Kobashi (written:  or ) is a Japanese surname. Notable people with the surname include:

, Japanese professional wrestler
, Japanese actress
, Japanese woodblock print artist, painter, sculptor, and stage designer

Japanese-language surnames